After is an art convention used in the titles and inscriptions of artworks to credit the original artist in the title of the copy. Often the title of the original work is retained, for example an interpretation by Rembrandt of da Vinci's The Last Supper becomes The Last Supper, after Leonardo da Vinci. The addendum, sometimes termed an attribution qualifier, may be used by the artist making the copy or a later curator or academic and features in the linked records that make up the Cultural Objects Name Authority. The term may be used regardless of how similar the two works appear. Curators have sometimes referred to the resulting imitation works as "after-[original artist's name]s", with works inspired by Albrecht Dürer being after-Dürers. In some instances, artists have signed works made after the manner of their own indicating their approval of the copy.

Notable examples

See also
 Homage (arts)
 Appropriation (art)
 Imitation (art)

References

Further reading

External links
Q and Art: Copies of Artworks from the Smithsonian American Art Museum
After (attribution qualifier) in the Getty Vocabulary Program
After in the Glossary of Art-Related Terms by Essential Vermeer

Copying
The arts
Reuse
Naming conventions